Jérôme Dodo Gaye (sometimes shown as Jérôme Dogo Gaye, born October 17, 1939) is an Ivorian sprint canoer who competed in the late 1960s. He was eliminated in the repechages of the K-1 1000 m event at the 1968 Summer Olympics in Mexico City.

External links
Sports-reference.com profile

1939 births
Canoeists at the 1968 Summer Olympics
Ivorian male canoeists
Living people
Olympic canoeists of Ivory Coast